Polypoid means relating to or similar to a polyp, and may refer to:

Medicine
 Polypoid melanoma
 Atypical polypoid adenomyoma
 Polypoid basal-cell carcinoma

Other uses
 Organisms that form siphonophores

See also
 Polyploid